Ephraim Moravian Church is located in Ephraim, Wisconsin. It was added to the National Register of Historic Places in 1985.

History
The church was founded by Norwegian immigrant Andreas Iverson. Originally located on the shore of Eagle Harbor in Ephraim, the church was moved to its present location in 1883.

References

External links
Ephraim Moravian congregation observes its 125th anniversary by Jane Shea, Door County Advocate, May 23, 1978
Inventory of the church archives of Wisconsin, page 23, Works Progress Administration, 1938, discusses the history of Moravians in Ephraim

Churches on the National Register of Historic Places in Wisconsin
Moravian churches in the United States
Churches in Door County, Wisconsin
Norwegian-American culture in Wisconsin
Churches completed in 1859
National Register of Historic Places in Door County, Wisconsin